WLFM may refer to:

 WLFM (FM), a radio station (103.9 FM) licensed to serve Lawrenceburg, Tennessee, United States
 WRME-LD (formerly WLFM-LP from 2006 to 2012), a television station operating as a radio station in Chicago
 WOVM (formerly WLFM from 1956 to 2005), a radio station in Appleton, Wisconsin, United States
 WTCL-LD (formerly WLFM-LP from 2012 to 2021), a low-power television station (channel 20, virtual 6), licensed to serve Cleveland, Ohio, United States